Thomas Michael "T. M." Stevens (born July 28, 1951) is an American bass guitarist from New York City. Stevens has worked with an array of rock, R&B, and pop acts as a session musician, and also leads his own groups and works as a solo performer.

Life
Stevens recorded with his band Shocka Zooloo, a power trio that features Michael Barnes "Master Blaster" on guitar and Garry "G-Man" Sullivan on drums. Stevens, with the band Shocka Zooloo and earlier the band Out Of Control, has released seven albums, the most recent being Africans in the Snow for the SPV Steamhammer label.

Along with his work as both songwriter and producer, Stevens worked with other artists. Scheduling at least two European Shocka Zooloo tours each year, he also toured in 2004 with Jean Paul Bourelly and drummer John Blackwell, ex-drummer for Prince. In Autumn 2005 he completed an Asian tour with Neil Zaza going directly into a lengthy European tour with Shocka Zooloo. Stevens finished 2005 with a collaboration with Carl Palmer and Andrea Braido in Italy and Russia which was followed by a European ELP tour in February 2006. In 2007, he was the touring bassist for The Headhunters. In March 2008 while on his solo tour his bus was attacked by fireworks thrown by a young fan, the young fan who could only be called JO due to legal reasons was charged with vandalism and given community work. In summer 2011 he joined the Bootsy Collins Funk Unity Tour.

Steven's vocals came about through James Brown's insistence that he not only play bass but sing on "Living in America" and on Brown's album, Gravity.

Stevens has recorded with many artists including Steve Vai, Neil Zaza, Cyndi Lauper, Little Steven, Tina Turner, Dan Hartman and Billy Joel. He was a member of The Pretenders 1986-87, and recorded on the platinum-selling album Get Close. He produced and arranged the album Tribute to Deep Purple According to New York, collaborating with Vinnie Moore, members of Living Colour and Bernie Worrell of Parliament-Funkadelic. Stevens performed on Joe Cocker's album, Unchain My Heart. Together with Narada Michael Walden he penned the Billboard hit "I Should Have Loved Ya".

His early jazz years brought him to play with the jazz trumpeter, songwriter and bandleader Miles Davis.

Stevens has been a resident of West Long Branch, New Jersey. From around 2017 on T.M. has been battling with dementia and has not played live since.
 1993 - Steve Vai - Sex & Religion
 1993 - Taylor Dayne - Send Me a Lover
 1993 - Billy Joel - River of Dreams
 1993 - Gabrielle Roth - Trance
 1993 - Joe Cocker - Best of Joe Cocker
 1992 - Taylor Dayne - Soul Dancing
 1992 - Joe Cocker - Night Calls
 1991 - Two Rooms - Celebrating the Songs of
 1991 - Tina Turner - Simply the Best
 1991 - Curtis Stigers - Curtis Stigers
 1990 - Joe Cocker - Live!
 1990 - Darlene Love - Paint Another Picture
 1990 - Riot - The Privilege of Power
 1989 - Very Special Christmas - Very Special Christmas
 1989 - Tina Turner - Foreign Affair
 1989 - Cyndi Lauper - Night to Remember
 1989 - Taylor Dayne - Can't Fight Fate
 1989 - Joe Cocker - One Night of Sin
 1987 - Little Steven and the Disciples of soul - Freedom - no compromise
 1987 - Joe Cocker - Unchain My Heart
 1987 - Nona Hendryx - Female Trouble (Co wrote "Funky Land" B-side single)
 1986 - Pretenders - Get Close
 1986 - James Brown - Gravity
 1986 - Gregory Abbott - Shake You Down
 1986 - Billy Squier - Enough Is Enough
 1986 - Lovebug Starski - House Rocker
 1983 - Tramaine - Search Is Over
 1983 - Gary Private - Secret Love
 1982 - Yoshiaki Masuo - Mellow Focus
 1980 - David Sancious - Just As I Thought
 1980 - Yoshiaki Masuo - Masuo Live
 1980 - Yoshiaki MASUO - Song is You and Me
 1979 - Narada Michael Walden - Dance of Life (co-wrote the hit single "I shoulda loved ya")
 1979 - Yoshiaki Masuo - Good Morning
 1979 - Yoshiaki Masuo - Sunshine Avenue
 1978 - Yoshiaki Masuo - Sailing Wonder

References

External links
 
 Photos: TMS tevens live in Salzburg / Austria
 Bass Guitar Magazine Interview with TM in Issue 3 - UK's No.1 bass magazine
 TM Stevens interview at Allaboutjazz.com
 Pretenders 977 Radio
TM Stevens Interview for the NAMM Oral History Program 

  TM Stevens teaches at Camp Rock

1951 births
Living people
American rock bass guitarists
American funk bass guitarists
American male bass guitarists
American male guitarists
African-American guitarists
The Pretenders members
People from West Long Branch, New Jersey
Guitarists from New York (state)
20th-century American guitarists